"The Bumper of My SUV" is a song written and recorded by American country music artist Chely Wright.  It was released in November 2004 as the third single from her album The Metropolitan Hotel.  The song garnered attention when it was first played for troops while Wright was visiting Iraq.

Background and writing
The song was inspired by an actual incident, according to Wright. She told Billboard magazine that in mid-2003, she was driving in Nashville when a motorist in a minivan behind her noticed the Marine Corps sticker on the artist's bumper. Wright's brother is a Marine who sent her the sticker before he shipped off to Iraq. Wright said that the woman began honking, swerving and flicking her lights. "I look in the rear view, and she's flipping me the bird, hard, I thought I cut her off, because I'm a really bad driver." She went on to say that when the woman finally pulled up next to her and motioned for her to roll down her window she screamed "Your war is wrong. You're a baby killer." She went home and immediately wrote the song.

Content
Written entirely by Wright, the song is a ballad, accompanied almost exclusively by piano. Its lyrics are a first-person account of a woman who is driving her SUV. She is given the finger by another driver, because she (the singer) has "a bright red sticker for the U.S. Marines / on the bumper of [her] SUV". The singer then defends her sticker, stating that her family served in the Marines. Wright has stated that she did not intend for the song to be pro-war. In addition, she has stated that she recorded the song begrudgingly, and did not intend for it to be a single.

Wright's fan club

While the song was climbing the charts, it was discovered that members of Wright's fan club were contacting radio stations nationwide, requesting increased airplay for the song to help it climb the charts. These fan club members had posed as family or friends of military members when making their requests. After discovering the actions of her fan club's members, Wright fired the club's leader, with whom she had been friends since 1996.

Re-release
Signed to Dualtone Records at the time, Wright released "The Bumper of My SUV" in November 2004 as the second single from her album The Metropolitan Hotel. The song soon became the second fastest-selling single on the Billboard country sales charts at the time, and reached a peak of #35 on the U.S. Hot Country Singles & Tracks (now Hot Country Songs) charts.

Critical reception
Allmusic critic Stephen Thomas Erlewine, in his review of The Metropolitan Hotel, described the song as follows: "[T]he cloying 'The Bumper of My S.U.V.' is well-intentioned but is one of the more awkward Iraqi war songs — but those missteps only enhance the feeling that this album is a personal work for Wright, and that she's willing to make mistakes along the way."

The Onion reviews this song as follows: "As far as jingoistic songs go, Chely Wright's "The Bumper Of My SUV" is pretty tame, essentially an examination of blue-red relations. Still, it's pretty hilarious: A woman in a mini-van gives Wright the finger, and Wright assumes it's because she has a U.S. Marines bumper sticker on her SUV. Hey Chely, maybe it's because you're taking up two lanes or wasting what's left of the earth's petroleum. Who knew that pro-America country singers—with especially overwrought Southern accents—hated minivans and private school?"

Music video
The music video features her performance of the song on the Grand Ole Opry intercut with footage shot during her visits with troops in Iraq.

Chart performance

Original version

Re-release

References

2004 singles
Chely Wright songs
Songs written by Chely Wright
Works about the United States Marine Corps
Dualtone Records singles
2004 songs